Bilaal or Bilal, is a village in the Hiran region of Somalia, located 10 km (6.4 mi) west of Jalalaqsi and 145 km (90 mi) northwest of the Somalian capital Mogadishu.

Location
Bilaal is located 10 km (6.4 mi) west of Jalalaqsi and 145 km (90 mi) northwest of the Somalian capital Mogadishu.

History
Although it is now a small village, Bilal is one of the oldest settlements in Hiran region, during the colonial period it was a very developed area, was built at the first school in Hiran region (Bilal Primary and Secondary School). 

Bilal is the home of many notable people such businessmen like Abukar Osman and Haji Qurow, poets like Abukar Fanahow, religious preacher Islow Nur Abikar and the first Somalian Defence Minister Abdirahman Haji Mumin.

References

Populated places in Hiran, Somalia